Peter Paul Halajian (1864 in Armenia – 1927 in Naugatuck, Connecticut) was a candy manufacturer in the New Haven, Connecticut, area in the early 20th century.  Born Peter Halajian in Armenia, he immigrated to the U.S. in 1890 and worked in a rubber factory, opening a candy shop on February 1, 1895, in Naugatuck, Connecticut, and changing his surname to the English equivalent Paul.  After selling chocolate bars to the U.S. Army for use by soldiers in World War I, who demanded them when they came home, he teamed with five other Armenian investors (including his brother-in-law Cal Kazanjian, Cal's cousin Artin Kazanjian, chemist George Shamlian, Jacob Chouljian and his cousin Jacob Hagopian) to form the Peter Paul Candy Manufacturing Company on Webster Street in New Haven in 1919 with $6,000.  The company at first sold various brands of candies, including the Mounds bar, but following sugar and coconut shortages in World War II, they dropped most brands and concentrated on the Mounds bar, with the U.S. military purchasing as much as 80% of their output by 1944, packing 5 million candy bars monthly into combat rations.  The Almond Joy bar was introduced in 1946.  In 1978 Peter Paul merged with Cadbury-Schweppes.

References 

American people of Armenian descent
1864 births
1927 deaths
Businesspeople in confectionery
Emigrants from the Ottoman Empire to the United States